Heterotilapia is a genus of cichlid fish that are native to rivers from Guinea-Bissau to Liberia in tropical West Africa. Formerly considered a subgenus of Tilapia, in 2013, it was elevated to genus rank. They are substrate spawners and brooders (not mouthbrooders as some other tilapias). H. buttikoferi is a common species that also has been introduced outside its native range, but H. cessiana is highly localized and critically endangered.

Species
Two recognized species are in this genus:

 Heterotilapia buttikoferi (Hubrecht, 1881) (zebra tilapia)
 Heterotilapia cessiana (Thys van den Audenaerde, 1968)

References

Cichlidae
Pseudocrenilabrinae